Ainagul Aizharikhova (born ) is a Kazakhstani volleyball player. She is part of the Kazakhstan women's national volleyball team.

She competed at the  2015 FIVB Volleyball World Grand Prix.
On club level she played for Astana in 2015.

References

External links
http://worldgrandprix.2015.fivb.com/en/finals-3/competition/teams/kaz-kazakhstan/players/ainagul-aizharikhova?id=44470

http://iis.siccsports.com/Sports/Biographies/Athletes_Profile/?ParticCode=5109823&lang=en

1994 births
Living people
Kazakhstani women's volleyball players
Place of birth missing (living people)
Volleyball players at the 2014 Asian Games
Asian Games competitors for Kazakhstan
21st-century Kazakhstani women